USS Metacom may refer to the following ships operated by the United States Navy:

, a net tender later reclassified YTB-740.
, a  serving the Naval Submarine Base, New London, Connecticut

United States Navy ship names